The Neftchi Baku 2006–07 season was Neftchi Baku's fifteenth  Azerbaijan Premier League season. This was their first, and only, season with Gurban Gurbanov as their manager. They finished 2nd in the league behind Khazar Lankaran and were knocked out of the Azerbaijan Cup at the semifinal stage by MKT Araz.

Squad

Transfers

Summer

In:

Out:

Winter

In:

Out:

Competitions

Azerbaijan Premier League

Results
Source:

Table

Azerbaijan Cup

Source:

Squad statistics

Appearances and goals

|-
|colspan="14"|Players away from Neftchi Baku on loan :

|-
|colspan="14"|Players who appeared for Neftchi Baku who left during the season:
|}

Goal scorers

Notes
Qarabağ have played their home games at the Tofiq Bahramov Stadium since 1993 due to the ongoing situation in Quzanlı.
Neftchi Baku awarded the win.

References

External links 
 Neftchi Baku at Soccerway.com

Neftçi PFK seasons
Neftchi Baku